Sacha Lancaster (born March 29, 1979) is a former gridiron football player. He played as a fullback/linebacker for the Los Angeles Avengers, the New Orleans VooDoo, the Detroit Fury, the Hamilton Tiger-Cats and the Jacksonville Sharks.  He spent two seasons playing in NFL Europe with the Hamburg Sea Devils and Rhein Fire. Lancaster was arrested in October of 2015 for selling narcotics to an undercover police officer at Maumelle High School in Maumelle, Arkansas.

College career
Lancaster played four years (1998–2002) at Arkansas.  He played his first three seasons as a defensive lineman and his senior season as a fullback.  He recorded 63 defensive tackles, 12 tackles for losses and 5.5 quarterback sacks in 34 games as a defensive lineman.  His most memorable sack came in the 1999 Citrus Bowl when he sacked current New England Patriots quarterback Tom Brady.  During his 4-year career, he played in the 1999 Citrus Bowl, the 2000 Cotton Bowl, the 2000 Las Vegas Bowl and the 2002 Cotton Bowl.

References
Just Sports Stats
Tiger-Cats player profile
 ArenaFan.com player profile

1979 births
Living people
Players of American football from San Antonio
American football fullbacks
American football linebackers
Arkansas Razorbacks football players
Los Angeles Avengers players
Arkansas Twisters players
New Orleans VooDoo players
Detroit Fury players
Hamburg Sea Devils players
Rhein Fire players
Hamilton Tiger-Cats players
Jacksonville Sharks players

https://www.thv11.com/amp/article/news/local/maumelle/former-razorback-arrested-for-selling-drugs-in-school-parking-lot/91-188732927